Andrew (Andy) Miller (born 13 September 1972) is a former professional rugby player from New Zealand who played as a fly half and represented the Japan national rugby union team.

Miller started his career with Bay of Plenty and played in the inaugural 1996 Super 12 season for the Canterbury Crusaders, before moving to Japan to play for the Kobelco Steelers.

After qualifying to play for  through residency, Miller made his international debut in May 2002 against . Graham Henry said that he could have pushed for a place in the All Blacks side.

He was selected for the Japan squad for the 2003 Rugby World Cup. where he kept the leading Japanese points scorer of all time Keiji Hirose out of the team and was credited with helping them to some credible performances and was noted as one of Japan's best players at the tournament. He notably scored a 52-metre drop goal against  which was the longest in Rugby World Cup history.

He didn't play again for Japan after the World Cup after they briefly made a policy not to select foreign born players in 2004, and Miller returned to New Zealand to play for Southland.

References

External links
Miller's career blossoms after Japan move - Rugby Heaven, 19 October 2003
Japan show size is not everything - Electronic Telegraph, 26 October 2003
Andy J. Miller profile - New Zealand Rugby History

1972 births
Living people
New Zealand rugby union players
Kobelco Kobe Steelers players
Expatriate rugby union players in Japan
Japan international rugby union players
New Zealand expatriate rugby union players
New Zealand expatriate sportspeople in Japan
Bay of Plenty rugby union players
Southland rugby union players
Crusaders (rugby union) players
Rugby union fly-halves
Rugby union players from the Bay of Plenty Region